Aechmea cucullata is a plant species in the genus Aechmea. This species is native to Colombia and Ecuador.

Cultivars
 Aechmea 'Orange River'

References

cucullata
Flora of Ecuador
Flora of Colombia
Plants described in 1988